Walter Bosshard may refer to:

Walter Bosshard (footballer)
Walter Bosshard (photojournalist), photographer and journalist